Nibra is a census town in Domjur CD Block of Howrah Sadar subdivision in Howrah district in the Indian state of West Bengal. It is a part of Kolkata Urban Agglomeration.

Demographics
As per 2011 Census of India Nibra had a total population of 27,818 of which 14,388 (52%) were males and 13,430 (48%) were females. Population below 6 years was 3,584. The total number of literates in Nibra was 21,219 (87.56% of the population over 6 years).

Nibra was part of Kolkata Urban Agglomeration in 2011 census.

 India census, Nibra had a population of 22,288. Males constitute 52% of the population and females 48%. Nibra has an average literacy rate of 72%, higher than the national average of 59.5%: male literacy is 76% and female literacy is 69%. In Nibra, 14% of the population is under 6 years of age.

Communication
There is a Sub-Post office in North Nibra.

Transport
Nibra is the junction of National Highway 16 (part of Asian Highway 45) and Kona Expressway. People can easily go to several areas of Kolkata, Howrah and Hooghly from here.

Bus

Private Bus
 40 Birshibpur - Serampore
 79 Panchla - Dunlop
 E43 Dihibhursut - Howrah Station
 E53 Narit - Howrah Station
 K11 Domjur - Rabindra Sadan
 L3 Jhikhira/Muchighata - Howrah Station

CTC Bus
 C11 Domjur - B.B.D. Bagh/Belgachia
 E6 Amta - Esplanade
 E7 Bagnan railway station - Esplanade
Many Shuttle Buses (Without Numbers) also pass through Nibra.

Train
Santragachi Junction is the nearest railway station.

Healthcare
There is a Hospital named Health-For-All at Katlia bus stoppage.

References

Cities and towns in Howrah district
Neighbourhoods in Kolkata
Kolkata Metropolitan Area